J. Karen Thomas (1965 – March 26, 2015) was an American actress, singer, and voice artist. Her numerous television credits included her role as Audrey Carlisle on the dramatic television series, Nashville. Other television roles included recurring roles and guest appearances on Drop Dead Diva, The Ellen Show and Criminal Minds. Thomas' cinematic credits included The Identical (2014), Captive (2015), and a co-starring role in the 2014 film, Boulevard, which was shot in her native Nashville, opposite Robin Williams.

Thomas was born in Nashville, Tennessee, and graduated from Memphis State University, now known as the University of Memphis. During the mid to late 80's, she was the midday DJ at popular Nashville radio station WYHY, Y107 (now WRVW, 107.5 The River).  She was a valuable member  the Nashville theater community. In 2013, Thomas won the Circle Award for Best Supporting Actress for her portrayal of Shug Avery in The Color Purple. She also released two albums during her career.

J. Karen Thomas was diagnosed with multiple myeloma in January 2015. Thomas died from the disease on March 26, 2015, at the age of 50. She is survived by her partner of 18 years, Colette Divine.

References

External links

1965 births
2015 deaths
Deaths from multiple myeloma
American film actresses
American stage actresses
American television actresses
American voice actresses
Deaths from cancer
University of Memphis alumni
Actresses from Nashville, Tennessee
LGBT actresses
LGBT African Americans
American LGBT actors
21st-century American women